Ashish Sen is an American professor and transportation statistician based in Chicago. He currently serves as Vice Chairman of the Chicago Transit Authority and President of South-East Asia Center.

In 1998, Sen was nominated by President Bill Clinton and confirmed by the United States Senate as the Director of the Bureau of Transportation Statistics in the U.S. Department of Transportation. His research has centered on the ways in which mathematical theories can help analyze human movement within any given space.

Early life and education
Sen was born in Delhi in 1942 and raised in Dacca , New Delhi and Calcutta. He went to Loretto House, St. Columba's School, St. Xavier's College and later completed his bachelor's degree in Mathematics from the University of Calcutta. After that, he went to Canada and earned his doctorate in 1971 from the University of Toronto.

Career 
From 1969 through 1998, Sen worked as a professor and as an administrator at the University of Illinois at Chicago Circle and its successor institution, the University of Illinois at Chicago (UIC). Besides teaching, Sen served, at certain times, as Dean and as Director of the School of Urban Sciences and later as Director of the School of Urban Planning.

While at UIC, he wrote the proposal which resulted in the creation of the Urban Transportation Center. Sen became its director in 1996. He published extensively, including planning manuals for paratransit and transit. He also wrote two books. In the late 1980s, Sen worked on the ADVANCE project, a major research project on car navigation systems.

In 1980, Sen went on leave from UIC to work for the Government of India Planning Commission under the leadership of Manmohan Singh. In 1990, Sen was appointed to the Chicago Board of Education, where he chaired the Real Estate and later the Budget/Finance Committees.

In 1998, President Bill Clinton nominated Sen as the Director of the Bureau of Transportation Statistics in the Department of Transportation. The responsibility of the Bureau was to collect and analyze data related to transportation to help improve the national transportation system. During this time, he served on the Executive Committee of the Transportation Research Board and was the lead author of Changing Face of Transportation, the Clinton Administration's transportation legacy document, which reviewed the last 25 years of transportation and speculated on the next 25. He chaired the DOT-NASA Committee on Remote Sensing.

Sen is active in the political activities of the Asian diaspora in America. He was on the Founding Board of the Indo-American Center and the Asian American Institute. In 2007, he was elected the President of South-East Asia Center and in 2013 elected as the President of the Indo-American Democratic Organization.

In 2012, Governor Pat Quinn appointed Sen to the Chicago Transit Authority's board and the next year, he appointed him to Northeastern Illinois Public Transit Task Force, created to recommend overhauling the entire region's transit system. In 2015, Board members of Chicago Transit Authority elected Sen as vice chairman.

He has authored numerous articles and co-authored two books relating to statistics and transportation. Sen is a Fellow of the American Statistical Association and the Royal Statistical Society.

Personal life 
Sen is married to Colleen Taylor Sen, an author, and lives in Chicago.

Bibliography 
Regression Analysis: Theory, Methods and Applications, co-authored with Muni Srivastava.
Gravity Models of Spatial Interaction Behavior, co-authored with Tony E. Smith.

References 

Indian emigrants to the United States
1942 births
Living people
American statisticians
University of Calcutta alumni
University of Toronto alumni
People from Chicago
Fellows of the American Statistical Association
Mathematicians from Illinois
Members of the Chicago Board of Education